The 2003–04 Scottish Challenge Cup was the 13th season of the competition, competed for by all 30 members of the Scottish Football League. The defending champions were Queen of the South, who defeated Brechin City 2–0 in the 2002 final. Queen of the South were eliminated in the first round after defeat against Stranraer

The final was played on 26 October 2003, between Inverness Caledonian Thistle and Airdrie United at McDiarmid Park, Perth. Inverness Caledonian Thistle won 2–0, to claim their first 'major' cup.

Schedule

First round 
Berwick Rangers and Dumbarton received random byes into the second round.

Source: ESPN Soccernet

Second round 

Source: ESPN Soccernet

Quarter-finals

Semi-finals

Final

External links 
 ESPN Soccernet Scottish League Challenge Cup page 

Scottish Challenge Cup seasons
Challenge Cup